Zanthoxylum liboense (Chinese: 荔波花椒 (Pinyin: lì bō huā jiāo) is a plant in the Rutaceae family.

Description
Z. liboense is a shrub or climbing vine that reaches 1.5 meters high. The branchlets and leaf shafts have many hooks and short spines. Its biennial branches are brown-black with fine longitudinal wrinkles and short hairs. The leaf shafts are round and pubescent with the inflorescence shaft and petiole. The leaves have 5-9 leaflets. The leaflets are nearly opposite or alternate, thin leathery, entire, ovoid or elliptical, 6–8 cm long, 2.5-3.5 cm wide, round base, acuminate or short apex at the top, symmetrical on both sides, the back of the leaf is short-haired. The midrib is flat on the leaf surface, while the upper half is slightly concave, puberulent. Leaflets have 10 lateral veins on each side -13; small petioles are 2–5 mm long. 

The flowers have not been seen. Infructescence axillary, 3–4 cm long, the fruit sequence axis is slender than the petiole; the fruit stalk is 6–10 mm long; each fruit is composed of 4 lobules, densely pubescent when young, and sparsely hairs when mature. The diameter of a single branch is 7–8 mm, and the oil spot is not obvious. The awn tip on the top side is 1-1.5 mm long, and it is dark brown and black when dried; the seed diameter is 5–6 mm. Fruiting period from August to September.

Habitat 
It is native to Libo, Guizhou, China. It is found in the shaded forests or bushes of valleys at an altitude of about 730 meters.

References

liboense